The Learning Resource Server Medicine (LRSMed) is a free-to-access catalog of electronic learning and teaching software modules for education in medicine and dentistry available in English and German.

History 
The LRSMed was developed at the Institut für Medizinische Informatik, Biometrie und Epidemiologie (IMIBE) of the University Duisburg-Essen, Germany, within the joint research project "Vision 2003", funded by the German Ministry for Education and Research.

Content 
The LRSMed includes electronic learning and teaching software modules for education in medicine and dentistry, which are deployed in the World Wide Web free of charge. The learning resources are described with a quasi-standard of metadata, the IMS Learning Resource Meta-data Information Model. Users are able to search for entries using several parameters as medical field, type of learning resource and language.

Status 
The LRSMed is maintained at the Institut für Medizinische Informationsverarbeitung, Biometrie und Epidemiologie (IBE) of the Ludwig-Maximilians-Universität München, Germany (September 2013). , 1705 learning resources are registered. The LRSMed was evaluated or used in several independent studies.

References

External links 
 

Medical education in Germany